Fort Totten Park is an American Civil War memorial on the site of a Union fort in Washington, DC. It is under the management of the National Park Service.

History
Fort Totten was a Union Army defensive earthwork, built during the Civil War and named for Joseph Totten. It was built up during the fall of 1861, as part of the defense of Washington, D.C., during the Civil War, also known as the Fort Circle. Construction on the fort began in August 1861 and was completed in 1863.

Fort Totten was one of seven temporary earthwork forts built in the Northeast quadrant of the city by the Union Army to protect the city from the Confederate Army. From west to east, the forts were as follow: Fort Slocum, Fort Totten, Fort Slemmer, Fort Bunker Hill, Fort Saratoga, Fort Thayer and Fort Lincoln. Today, it has become a park administered by the National Park Service in the neighborhood of Fort Totten.

Structure
It was located atop a ridge along the main road from Washington to Silver Spring, Maryland, about three miles (5 km) north of the Capitol, and a half-mile from the Military Asylum or Soldiers' Home, where President Abraham Lincoln spent his summers while president. Outside the walls (or "ramparts") was a large ditch or dry moat over seven feet deep and twelve feet wide, and outside that was a broad cleared area surrounding a barrier of tree branches, brambles and general debris (or abatis). Along the inner surface of the wall were gun platforms for several types of cannon, some firing over the parapet, others firing through openings in it, and a banquette, a kind of shelf on which soldiers could stand to fire over the wall.

The fort had the following armement:
 Four 6-pounder field guns (bronze)
 Eight 32-pounder Parrotts
 Two 8-inch siege howitzers
 One Coehorn mortar
 One 10-inch mortar M. 1841
 Three 30-pounder Parrotts
 One 100-pounder Parrott

Wartime garrisons were manned by:
 76th New York Infantry (Headquarters in February 1862)
 2nd Pennsylvania Heavy Artillery Regiment
 136th Pennsylvania Infantry
 137th Pennsylvania Infantry

The fort saw action during the Battle of Fort Stevens on July 11 and 12, 1864 when Confederate General Jubal A. Early attacked the fort.

Post Civil War
With the end of the war in 1865, the fort was deactivated. Today, it is maintained by the National Park Service but is in poor state.

A Washington Metro station, Fort Totten station, is named after the fort.  The city street hugging the line to the rear of the fort is called Fort Totten Drive.

See also

 Civil War Defenses of Washington
 Washington, D.C., in the American Civil War
 Fort Slocum
 Fort Slemmer
 Fort Bunker Hill
 Fort Saratoga
 Fort Thayer
 Fort Lincoln
 Battle of Fort Stevens

References

External links
 National Park Service Fort Totten
 National Park Service: Civil War Defenses of Washington
 Dekeworld: Fort Totten (History and Images)
 Amazing Civil War Photos of Fort Totten - Ghosts of DC blog

Civil War defenses of Washington, D.C.
National Park Service areas in Washington, D.C.
Parks in Washington, D.C.
Forts on the National Register of Historic Places in Washington, D.C.
American Civil War on the National Register of Historic Places
Washington, D.C., in the American Civil War
Fort Totten (Washington, D.C.)